This is a list of newspapers in Vermont.

DailiesThis is a list of daily newspapers currently published in Vermont. For weekly newspapers, see List of newspapers in Vermont.

 Barre Montpelier Times Argus - Barre, Vermont
 Bennington Banner - Bennington, Vermont
 Brattleboro Reformer - Brattleboro, Vermont
 Burlington Free Press - Burlington, Vermont
 Caledonian-Record - St. Johnsbury, Vermont
 Newport Daily Express - Newport, Vermont
 Rutland Herald - Rutland, Vermont
 St. Albans Messenger - St. Albans, Vermont

Weeklies
Addison County Independent - Addison County, Vermont
 The Chronicle - Barton, Vermont
 Bradford Journal-opinion - Bradford, Vermont
 The Citizen - Charlotte and Hinesburg, Vermont
The Commons - Brattleboro, Vermont
 Deerfield Valley News - Wilmington, Vermont
Franklin County Courier- Enosburg Falls, Vermont
 Hardwick Gazette - Hardwick, Vermont
 The Islander - North Hero, Vermont
 Manchester Journal - Manchester, Vermont
News & Citizen - Morrisville, Vermont
 Mountain Times - Killington, Vermont
 Northfield News & Transcript - Northfield, Vermont
 The Other Paper - South Burlington, Vermont
 Randolph Herald - Randolph, Vermont
Seven Days - Burlington, Vermont
 Shelburne News - Shelburne, Vermont
Stowe Reporter - Stowe, Vermont
 The Vermont Standard - Woodstock, Vermont
 Washington World - Barre, Vermont
 Williston Observer - Williston, Vermont

Online only
Born Digital Newspapers
 VT Digger (Website)
 The Chester Telegraph (Website) See also: The Chester Telegraph on Wikipedia.
 The Newport Dispatch (Website)
 The Waterbury Roundabout (Website)

Newspapers that have ended their print editions and moved to only publishing online include:
 Colchester Sun - Colchester, Vermont
 Essex Reporter - Essex, Vermont
 Milton Independent - Milton, Vermont

Defunct newspapers
 Middlebury Free Press – Middlebury, Vermont
 Middlebury Register – Middlebury, Vermont
 North Star (Vermont newspaper)—Danville, Vermont
 Vermont Record – Brandon, Vermont
 Vermont Republican and American Journal. Windham, Windsor and Orange County Advertiser – Windsor, Vermont - Existed in 1830.

References

Further reading
 List of Vermont newspapers, as of 1842, in: Zadock Thompson. History Of Vermont, Natural, Civil And Statistical, In Three Parts, With A Few Map Of The State, And 200 Engravings. Burlington, VT: Goodrich, 1842

External links
 Eighteenth-Century Vermont Newspapers in the Library of Congress

Vermont

Newspapers
</noinclude>